The tournament was moved from Shanghai to Beijing in 2004. Last champions in Shanghai were Émilie Loit and Nicole Pratt. Pratt teamed up with Tamarine Tanasugarn but they were eliminated in semifinals.

Emmanuelle Gagliardi and Dinara Safina won the title by defeating Gisela Dulko and María Vento-Kabchi 6–4, 6–4 in the final.

Seeds

Draw

Draw

Qualifying

Seeds

Qualifiers
  Natalie Grandin /  Antonia Matic

Qualifying draw

References
 Official results archive (ITF)
 Official results archive (WTA)

China Open
2004 China Open (tennis)